Lewis Craig Humphrey (1875–1927) was a prominent Kentucky newspaper editor who began his journalistic career as a reporter at the Louisville daily newspaper, the Louisville Evening Post, under the supervision of editor and publisher Richard W. Knott. Upon Knott's death, Humphrey became chief editor of the paper.

Early life and education
Humphrey was the son of Judge Edward William Cornelius Humphrey (1844–1917) and Jessamine Barkley (1846–1905). He attended public school in Louisville and graduated from Centre College in Danville, Kentucky, in 1896.

Political activity
Humphrey was active in politics with the Democratic Party of Kentucky. The Kentucky Irish American, a newspaper in Louisville, reported on page 1 in an article headlined "Democrats Enthused by Reorganization of the Party in City and State" that Lewis Humphrey was a member of the organizational committee which wanted to "mark the end of Republican machine rule in Kentucky." According to the Kingsport Times (Tennessee), shortly after he became a reporter he was made news writer, city editor, and associate editor of the Evening Post "with full dictation of editorial and political policy" until it merged with the Herald, at which time he became associate editor of the Louisville Herald-Post. The merger was planned by publisher/financier James Buckner Brown to balance the influence of the Barry Bingham, Sr family newspapers, including the Louisville Courier Journal, but the Herald-Post lost its financial support when another of Brown's enterprises failed.

Newspaper career
His fraternity Sigma Chi at Centre College announced in the Sigma Chi Quarterly an early editorial assignment for Humphrey as editor of The Cento, the Centre College newspaper.
After his tenure at the Louisville Evening Post with editor and publisher Knott, Humphrey worked his way up through the ranks to become chief editor at the Louisville Herald. After the Herald's merger with the Louisville Post, he became associate editor of the Louisville Herald-Post, a broadsheet daily newspaper founded by its original owner, financier James Buckner Brown (1925–1930), in 1925. After the source of Brown's own original wealth and capital investment failed, he relinquished the company in a bankruptcy sale. After additional takeovers and bankruptcies, the Louisville Herald-Post ceased publication in 1936. According to their website,"The newspaper's photo morgue was then donated to the Louisville Free Public Library where it was used extensively as a research collection before being accessioned by the University of Louisville Photographic Archives in 1994." The University of Louisville Library's Herald-Post Collection has digitally archived the old editions of the now defunct newspaper for which Lewis Craig Humphrey was associate editor. Of the 31 years Lewis Craig Humphrey worked as a Louisville journalist, all but three years were spent at the old Evening Post as chief editor.

Personal life
Humphrey married Eleanor Silliman Belknap (1876–1964), the eldest daughter of William Richardson Belknap, on December 19, 1904, at Lincliff, the home of the bride's parents. 

In 1914, he and his wife commissioned the design by Gray and Wischmeyer of their home in The Highlands. The house, built by the Alfred Struck Company is known as the Humphrey-McMeekin House and was placed on the National Register of Historic Places in 1983. The couple had two daughters and two sons.

Humphrey contracted cancer and died on February 3, 1927, at the age of 51. He was buried at Louisville's Cave Hill Cemetery.

References

External links
 
 New York Times obituary of Gerald D. Morgan
 
 

Writers from Louisville, Kentucky
Journalists from Kentucky
American male journalists
1875 births
1927 deaths
Burials at Cave Hill Cemetery
Centre College alumni
Editors of Kentucky newspapers